Revisionist History is a podcast by Malcolm Gladwell produced by Gladwell's company Pushkin Industries. It began in 2016 and has aired six 10-episode seasons.  

Gladwell, who was already a successful author and essayist, was convinced to create a podcast by his friend Jacob Weisberg, then editor-in-chief of Slate Group, which includes the podcast network Panoply Media. Seasons 1 to 3 of Revisionist History were produced by Panoply Media. In September 2018, after Panoply dropped the medium, Gladwell announced he was co-founding a podcast company Pushkin Industries with Weisberg. Pushkin produced the series from there on.

Each episode begins with an inquiry about a person, event, or idea, and proceeds to question the received wisdom about the subject.

Episodes

Season 1 (2016)

Season 2 (2017)

Season 3 (2018)

Season 4 (2019)

Season 5 (2020)

Season 6 (2021)

Reception
Revisionist History has received positive reviews from critics. In Podcast Review, Nic Dobija-Nootens called it "perplexing, frustrating, and always worth a second look". The New York Timess Amanda Hess praises the show's impact, crediting it for creating a "podcast micro-genre ... [of] history-bending show[s]".

See also 

 List of history podcasts

References

General references

External links 
 

Audio podcasts
Works by Malcolm Gladwell
2016 podcast debuts
History podcasts
Megaphone (podcasting)